The RiverView Theater is a theater located in RiverView Park in Shreveport, Louisiana. It serves as the home of the Shreveport Symphony Orchestra, Shreveport Opera and Shreveport Metropolitan Ballet.

History 
The 1,725-seat theater first opened in 1965 as the Shreveport Civic Theater.

See also
List of concert halls
List of music venues
List of opera houses
Theater in Louisiana

References

External links
Official website

Concert halls in Louisiana
Opera houses in Louisiana
Performing arts centers in Louisiana
Theatres in Louisiana
Music venues in Louisiana